Cutter and Bone is a 1976 thriller novel by Newton Thornburg about a Vietnam veteran, Alexander Cutter, who tries to convince his friend, Richard Bone, that Bone witnessed a murder. It was adapted to film by director Ivan Passer as Cutter's Way (1981) which starred John Heard as Cutter, Jeff Bridges as Bone, and Lisa Eichhorn as Mo (Maureen).

Release details
 Thornburg, Newton. Cutter and Bone. Serpent's Tail (reprint), 2001. 

1976 American novels
American thriller novels
American novels adapted into films
Little, Brown and Company books